Adam and the Devil is a 2007 Turkish drama film directed by Barış Pirhasan.

Cast 
 Nurgül Yeşilçay - Hacer
 Cem Özer - Hasan Hoca
 Derya Alabora - Sükran
 Asuman Dabak - Münevver
  - Resat
  - Musa

References

External links 

2007 drama films
2007 films
Turkish drama films